Aleksander Hellat (in Tartu – 28 November 1943, in Kemerovo Oblast) was an Estonian politician and a Minister of Foreign Affairs of Estonia. He was a member of the Estonian Social Democratic Workers' Party. After Estonia had been annexed by the Soviet Union, Hellat was arrested in 1940 by the NKVD and deported to a prison camp in Siberia, where he died three years later.

References

1881 births
1943 deaths
Politicians from Tartu
People from Kreis Dorpat
Estonian Social Democratic Workers' Party politicians
Ministers of the Interior of Estonia
Ministers of Foreign Affairs of Estonia
Mayors of Tallinn
Envoys of Estonia
People who died in the Gulag
Estonian people who died in Soviet detention